Johann Heinrich Baumann (9 February 1753 – 29 July 1832) was a Baltic German artist who mainly lived and worked in what is today Latvia.

Early life and education
Johann Heinrich Baumann was born in Jelgava into a German-speaking family. He was the son of the pastor and general superintendent of Mitau, Joachim Baumann.

University
Baumann went to University of Erfurt to study theology in 1773–1776. After his studies, Baumann returned to his Baltic homeland Courland but would henceforth pursue a career as an artist and not as a priest.

Travels
Being a keen hunter, Baumann travelled as far as present-day Lithuania, Russia and Belarus on hunting expeditions. He also wrote anecdotal, whimsical short stories about his hunting adventures, for which he has been called the "Munchausen of Courland". His outdoors interests also came to dominate his art completely, which is an unusual blend of skillfulness and professionalism mixed with naivety and slovenliness. Almost all his known paintings depict animals, hunting scenes or related subjects. His style is perhaps best characterised as a provincial form of Baroque, inspired to some extent by similar motives in Dutch Golden Age painting, executed in a highly personal way. Although he never became recognised as a major artist in Imperial Russia, he was still acknowledged by a special mention of the Imperial Academy of Arts in 1786. He is reputed to have painted over 1700 paintings, however only 43 surviving paintings are safely attributed to him today.

Playwriting
Baumann was also one of the first authors in present-day Latvia to write plays for the stage in Latvian.

See also
 List of Baltic German artists

References

External links

1753 births
1832 deaths
People from Jelgava
People from the Duchy of Courland and Semigallia
Baltic-German people
Baroque painters
Latvian dramatists and playwrights
Latvian-language writers
18th-century Latvian painters
19th-century Latvian painters
18th-century dramatists and playwrights
19th-century dramatists and playwrights
University of Erfurt alumni